Lochlainn Ó hUiginn (died 1464) was a member of the Ó hUiginn brehon family.

The Annals of Connacht relate that in 1461: Lochlainn son of Fercert O hUicinn died.

His father, Fercert Ó hUiginn, died in 1419.

External links
 The Annals of Connacht (translated) at CELT

15th-century Irish poets
Medieval Irish poets
People from County Mayo
People from County Sligo
People from County Galway
1461 deaths
Year of birth unknown
Irish male poets